Jagalchi Station is a station of the Busan Metro Line 1 in Nampo-dong, Jung District, Busan, South Korea.

External links

  Cyber station information from Busan Transportation Corporation

Busan Metro stations
Jung District, Busan
Railway stations opened in 1988
1988 establishments in South Korea
20th-century architecture in South Korea